You Can Negotiate Anything is a self-help book on negotiation by Herb Cohen. Cohen used story-telling to help explain the various concepts and strategies behind the art of negotiation. The 1982 book spent nine months on the New York Times bestseller list.

See also
 Conflict resolution research
 Negotiation theory
 List of books about negotiation

References

Negotiation
1982 non-fiction books
Business books
Personal development